Qassab Kola-ye Miandeh (also Romanized as Qaşşāb Kolā-ye Mīāndeh; also known as Qaşşāb Kolā) is a village in Lalehabad Rural District, Lalehabad District, Babol County, Mazandaran Province, Iran. At the 2006 census, its population was 493, in 121 families.

References 

Populated places in Babol County